Charlie Creek may refer to:

Charlie Creek (Florida), a stream in Hardee County and Polk County
Charlie Creek (South Dakota), a stream
Charlies Creek, a stream in Georgia

See also
Charley Creek (disambiguation)